Garden Acres is a census-designated place (CDP) in San Joaquin County, California, United States. The population was 10,648 at the 2010 census, up from 9,747 at the 2000 census. It is the most populous CDP in San Joaquin County.

Geography
Garden Acres is located at  (37.961373, -121.231345).

Popular nickname of the community is Okieville. All of Okieville lies east of California Highway 99. Garden Acres is further subdivided; as north of Main Street is known as Bigville, and south of Main Street known as Littleville.

Demographics

2010
The 2010 United States Census reported that Garden Acres had a population of 10,648. The racial makeup of Garden Acres was 5,244 (49.2%) White, 233 (2.2%) African American, 172 (1.6%) Native American, 358 (3.4%) Asian, 40 (0.4%) Pacific Islander, 3,908 (36.7%) from other races, and 693 (6.5%) from two or more races. Hispanic or Latino of any race were 7,338 persons (68.9%). This however has changed. It has almost tripled in size. 

The Census reported that 10,647 people (100% of the population) lived in households, 1 (0%) lived in non-institutionalized group quarters, and 0 (0%) were institutionalized.

There were 2,831 households, out of which 1,518 (53.6%) had children under the age of 18 living in them, 1,509 (53.3%) were opposite-sex married couples living together, 511 (18.1%) had a female householder with no husband present, 273 (9.6%) had a male householder with no wife present.  There were 238 (8.4%) unmarried opposite-sex partnerships, and 15 (0.5%) same-sex married couples or partnerships. 412 households (14.6%) were made up of individuals, and 175 (6.2%) had someone living alone who was 65 years of age or older. The average household size was 3.76.  There were 2,293 families (81.0% of all households); the average family size was 4.11.

The population was spread out, with 3,518 people (33.0%) under the age of 18, 1,216 people (11.4%) aged 18 to 24, 2,908 people (27.3%) aged 25 to 44, 2,158 people (20.3%) aged 45 to 64, and 848 people (8.0%) who were 65 years of age or older.  The median age was 28.7 years. For every 100 females, there were 105.4 males.  For every 100 females age 18 and over, there were 104.7 males.

The homeowner vacancy rate was 2.2%; the rental vacancy rate was 7.0%.  5,935 people (55.7% of the population) lived in owner-occupied housing units and 4,712 people (44.3%) lived in rental housing units.

2000
As of the census of 2000, there were 9,747 people, 2,760 households, and 2,188 families residing in the CDP. The racial makeup of the CDP was 55.03% White, 1.03% African American, 1.98% Native American, 3.82% Asian, 0.24% Pacific Islander, 31.63% from other races, and 6.28% from two or more races. Hispanic or Latino of any race were 53.08% of the population.

There were 2,760 households, out of which 44.9% had children under the age of 18 living with them, 54.5% were married couples living together, 17.2% had a female householder with no husband present, and 20.7% were non-families. 16.3% of all households were made up of individuals, and 7.3% had someone living alone who was 65 years of age or older.  The average household size was 3.53 and the average family size was 3.96.

In the CDP, the population was spread out, with 34.5% under the age of 18, 11.0% from 18 to 24, 28.7% from 25 to 44, 17.5% from 45 to 64, and 8.4% who were 65 years of age or older.  The median age was 28 years. For every 100 females, there were 101.4 males.  For every 100 females age 18 and over, there were 99.6 males.

The median income for a household in the CDP was $30,573, and the median income for a family was $31,316. Males had a median income of $26,773 versus $20,536 for females. The per capita income for the CDP was $10,469.  About 20.8% of families and 24.5% of the population were below the poverty line, including 30.9% of those under age 18 and 13.2% of those age 65 or over.

References

Census-designated places in San Joaquin County, California
Census-designated places in California